Mohamed Nahiri (born 22 October 1991) is a Moroccan footballer currently playing for Botola Pro side Raja as a full back and midfielder.

International career

International goals
Scores and results list Morocco's goal tally first.

Honours

Club

Fus Rabat
Botola: 2015–16
Coupe du Trône: 2014

Wydad Casablanca 
Botola: 2018–19
CAF Super Cup: 2018

Morocco
African Nations Championship:2018

References

1991 births
Living people
People from El Jadida
Moroccan footballers
Moroccan expatriate footballers
Morocco youth international footballers
Association football fullbacks
Association football midfielders
Difaâ Hassani El Jadidi players
Fath Union Sport players
Wydad AC players
Al-Ain FC (Saudi Arabia) players
Raja CA players
Botola players
Saudi Professional League players
Expatriate footballers in Saudi Arabia
Moroccan expatriate sportspeople in Saudi Arabia
Morocco international footballers
2018 African Nations Championship players
Morocco A' international footballers